The following is a list of people from Leavenworth County, Kansas.  The area includes Leavenworth, Kansas, Fort Leavenworth, Lansing, and rural areas in the county.  Inclusion on the list should be reserved for notable people past and present who have resided in the county, either in cities or rural areas.

Academia
 Donn B. Murphy, instructor of theatre and speech courses at Georgetown University from 1954 to 2000. At the invitation of Jacqueline Kennedy and Letitia Baldrige, he became a theatrical advisor to the John F. Kennedy and Lyndon B. Johnson Administrations for White House dramatic and music presentations in the East Room
 Ernest Fox Nichols, physicist awarded the Rumford Prize by the American Academy of Arts and Sciences in 1905 for his proof that light exerts pressure

Arts and entertainment
 Ashley Aull, competitor in the Miss USA pageant
 Danni Boatwright, sole survivor of the CBS series Survivor: Guatemala; Miss Kansas USA 1996
 Hilda Clark, actress and model
 Buffalo Bill Cody, soldier, buffalo hunter and wild west showman
 Harold Coyle, author
 Charles N. Daniels
 Melissa Etheridge, musician
 Adam Gnade, "talking songs" artist
 Fred Meyers, actor
 Brock Pemberton, theatrical producer, director and founder of the Tony Awards
 N. Clark Smith, music educator and composer
 Randy Sparks, musician, entertainer (New Christy Minstrels)

Aviation
 Paul Poberezny, founder of the Experimental Aircraft Association

Business
 Joseph W. Bettendorf, businessman
 Fred Harvey, prolific restaurateur
 Ron Logan, former Executive Vice President of Walt Disney Entertainment

Crime and law enforcement
 Wild Bill Hickok, soldier, lawman, gunfighter

Journalism
 Elizabeth Vargas, television journalist (ABC)

Military
 Robert Arter, retired United States Army Lieutenant General and former commanding general of the Sixth United States Army.
 Joseph Henderson, United States Army Sergeant, recipient of Medal of Honor
 David G. Perkins, current Commander of the United States Army Combined Arms Center 
 Russell Reeder, United States Army officer
 David C. Schilling, U.S. Air Force officer, fighter ace, and leading advocate of long-range jet fighter operations
 John A. Seitz, commanding general of the 1st Infantry Division and the XVIII Airborne Corps
 Richard J. Seitz, Army officer and Paratrooper  who commanded the 2nd Battalion, 517th Parachute Infantry Regiment during World War II, the 82nd Airborne Division and the XVIII Airborne Corps

Politics and government
 Daniel Read Anthony, abolitionist, newspaper publisher, mayor in 1863, brother of suffragist Susan B. Anthony
 Daniel Read Anthony, Jr., American Republican politician and a nephew of suffragist and political leader Susan B. Anthony
 Lucien Baker, United States Senator
 Lloyd Llewellyn Black, United States Federal Judge
 William Patterson Borland, United States Representative from Missouri
 William M. Boyle, Democratic political activist
 Thomas Carney, second Governor of Kansas
 Marti Crow, member of the Kansas House of Representatives
 Robert Crozier, United States Senator for Kansas
 Robert E. Davis, Kansas Supreme Court Justice
 Dwight D. Eisenhower, 34th President of the United States, served at Fort Leavenworth
 Thomas Ewing III, 33rd Commissioner of the U.S. Patent Office
 Thomas Ewing, Jr., attorney, the first chief justice of Kansas and leading free state advocate, Union Army general during the American Civil War, and two-term United States Congressman from Ohio
 Henry W. Green, judge on the Kansas Court of Appeals since 1993
 Paul Ranous Greever, United States Representative from Wyoming
 Doug Lamborn, United States Representative from Colorado
 Walter Nelles, co-founder and first chief legal counsel of the National Civil Liberties Bureau and its successor, the American Civil Liberties Union; achieved public notice for his legal work on behalf of pacifists charged with violating the Espionage Act during World War I and in other politically charged civil rights and constitutional law cases in later years
 Andrew Nisbet, Jr., member of the Washington House of Representatives and United States Army officer
 Edward Stillings, lawyer and member of the Kansas Legislature
 Samuel Hanson Stone, politician
 Edward T. Taylor, United States Representative from Colorado
 Van H. Wanggaard, member of the Wisconsin State Senate

Religion
 Sherwood Eddy, Protestant missionary
 William Merrell Vories, educator and missionary

Sports
 Chet Brewer, pitcher in baseball's Negro leagues; played for the Kansas City Monarchs; from 1957 to 1974 he scouted for the Pittsburgh Pirates
 Bill Burwell, relief pitcher in Major League Baseball for the St. Louis Browns and Pittsburgh Pirates
 Duff Cooley, professional baseball player for St. Louis Browns and Detroit Tigers
 Neil Dougherty, basketball coach
 Amy Hastings, track and field long distance running athlete, 2012 American champion in the 10,000 metres, a qualifier for the 2012 Summer Olympics
 Johnny Hetki, Major League baseball player
 Lance Hinson, head coach Saint Mary Spires football team
 Jack Killilay, Major League Baseball player
 Sean Malto, professional skateboarder
 Fred Raymer, major league baseball player
 John Shirreffs, Thoroughbred racehorse trainer
 Wayne Simien, basketball player
 Roy Zimmerman

See also

 Commandant of the United States Army Command and General Staff College
 List of inmates of United States Penitentiary, Leavenworth
 List of Saint Mary Spires head football coaches
 Lists of people from Kansas

References

Leavenworth County